The Morris Memorial Building is a historic building in Nashville, Tennessee, United States. It was built in the 1920s for the African-American National Baptist Convention, USA, Inc. and was named for longtime president Elias Camp Morris.

Location
The building is located at 330 Charlotte Avenue in Nashville, the county seat of Davidson County, Tennessee.

History
Construction began in 1924, and it was completed in 1926. It was built for the National Baptist Convention, USA, Inc., an African-American Christian denomination, to house the Nashville offices of the denomination's Sunday School Publishing Board. The building was also home to African-American businesses.

By 2016, it was "the only building still standing that is originally associated with African-American businesses in the downtown core", according to The Tennessean.

Architectural significance
The building was designed in the Neoclassical architectural style by the architectural firm McKissack & McKissack. It has been listed on the National Register of Historic Places since January 2, 1985.

References

Buildings and structures in Nashville, Tennessee
Religious buildings and structures completed in 1926
Neoclassical architecture in Tennessee
Properties of religious function on the National Register of Historic Places in Tennessee
National Baptist Convention, USA
African-American history in Nashville, Tennessee
National Register of Historic Places in Nashville, Tennessee